Point Conception Light is a lighthouse in Santa Barbara County, California, on Point Conception at the west entrance of the Santa Barbara Channel, California. One of the earliest California lighthouses, it is listed on the National Register of Historic Places on the Gaviota Coast.

History

Juan Rodríguez Cabrillo sailed along the California coast in search for glory and gold. On October 18, 1542, he encountered heavy winds upon rounding the Point and was forced to turn back to San Miguel Island where he died. Second-in-command Bartolomé Ferrer took charge and again tried to round the Point but he was also unsuccessful.

The Point was named Punta de la Limpia Concepcion by Sebastián Vizcaíno in 1602, who was the next Spanish sailor to venture the Pacific waters along the California coast after Juan Cabrillo. The 1835 experience of the sailing ship Pilgrim, which was damaged and nearly capsized in a sudden change of weather here, is typical of boaters even today.
 
It was here at Point Conception in 1856, that the lighthouse was built high on the sandstone cliffs, above the location of the present lighthouse. The first order Fresnel lens and steel tower for the lighthouse were made in France at a cost of $65,068 and was transported around Cape Horn. A report indicates that the lighthouse was severely damaged during the Fort Tejon earthquake of January 9, 1857.

The light station was automated by the United States Coast Guard in 1973.

The lighthouse was used as the location for the film The Monster of Piedras Blancas (1959), and has appeared on two Toad the Wet Sprocket music videos: Come Back Down (Pale) and Walk on the Ocean (Fear).

In recent years Vandenberg Air Force Base restricts access from the northwest, and the Jack and Laura Dangermond Preserve restricts access from the adjoining land although a few people have reached the lighthouse by hiking west along the narrow rugged public beach several miles from the nearest road during low tide. Some have also arranged well in advance with the Coast Guard for access.

See also

 List of lighthouses in the United States
 Channel Islands National Marine Sanctuary
 Channel Islands of California

References

Sources
Shipwrecks, Smugglers and Maritime Mysteries, by Wheeler & Kallman, 1986

External links

 Inventory of Historic Light Stations - California Lighthouses - Point Conception Light 

Transportation buildings and structures in Santa Barbara County, California
Lighthouses on the National Register of Historic Places in California
Lighthouses completed in 1856
Lighthouses completed in 1882
National Register of Historic Places in Santa Barbara County, California
Historic districts on the National Register of Historic Places in California